is a former Japanese professional footballer who last played forward for Fukushima United FC.

Career
Born in Kagoshima Prefecture, Hira made his debut for Sagan Tosu of the J1 League on 3 April 2013 against Kashima Antlers in the J.League Cup in which he entered in the 80th minute for Ryota Hayasaka and earned a yellow card three minutes afterward as Sagan Tosu lost the match 1–0.

Club statistics
Updated to 23 February 2019.

References

External links 

 Profile at Sagan Tosu
Profile at Thespakusatsu Gunma
Profile at Fukushima United FC

1994 births
Living people
Association football people from Kagoshima Prefecture
Japanese footballers
J1 League players
J2 League players
J3 League players
Sagan Tosu players
Thespakusatsu Gunma players
J.League U-22 Selection players
Fukushima United FC players
Association football forwards